The 1979–80 season was the 81st completed season of The Football League.

Bob Paisley's Liverpool retained their league championship trophy after fighting off a determined challenge by Dave Sexton's Manchester United. Nottingham Forest failed to make a sustained title challenge but compensated for this by retaining the European Cup.

Bristol City and Bolton Wanderers were relegated after brief, uneventful spells in the First Division notable only because Bristol City’s relegation ends the last time South West England had a team in the top tier until Swindon Town's promotion to the Premier League in 1993. On the other hand, Derby County's relegation came just five years after they had been league champions.

Kevin Keegan ended his three-year spell with Hamburger SV in Germany and returned to England in a shock £400,000 move to Southampton. Lawrie McMenemy's new signing was the transfer surprise of the season. Keegan was the current European Footballer of the Year and rated as one of the best strikers in the world, while Southampton were still struggling to establish themselves as a First Division side. But this move showed that Southampton had ambition and were determined to compete with the best.

Leicester City, Sunderland and Birmingham City ended their relatively short spells in the Second Division and occupied the division's three promotion places. Going down were Fulham, Burnley and Charlton Athletic.

Grimsby Town, Blackburn Rovers and Sheffield Wednesday all achieved some long-awaited success by gaining promotion from the Third Division. Bury, Southend United, Mansfield Town and Wimbledon occupied the Third Division's relegation places.

Fallen giants Huddersfield Town and Portsmouth finally achieved some success by gaining promotion from the Fourth Division. Newport County achieved their first promotion since 1939 and Walsall were also promoted. Re-election results are given at the end of this article.

Final league tables and results 
The tables and results below are reproduced here in the exact form that they can be found at The Rec.Sport.Soccer Statistics Foundation website with home and away statistics separated.

During the first five seasons of the league, that is, until the season 1893–94, re-election process concerned the clubs which finished in the bottom four of the league. From the 1894–95 season and until the 1920–21 season the re-election process was required of the clubs which finished in the bottom three of the league. From the 1922–23 season on it was required of the bottom two teams of both Third Division North and Third Division South. Since the Fourth Division was established in the 1958–59 season, the re-election process has concerned the bottom four clubs in that division.

First Division

Liverpool won the First Division title for the fourth time in five seasons, finishing two points above Manchester United, who had their best league campaign for more than a decade. Ipswich Town, Arsenal and Nottingham Forest completed the top five, with Forest also retaining the European Cup, while Arsenal were on the losing side in the finals of both the FA Cup and the European Cup Winners' Cup. Wolves, who finished sixth, won the League Cup.

Bolton Wanderers, Derby County and Bristol City were relegated to the Second Division.

Results

Managerial changes

Maps

Second Division

Leicester City won the Second Division title for a record sixth time to reclaim their First Division status after a two-year exile. Birmingham City achieved an instant return to the elite in third place, while the final promotion place went to Sunderland.

Chelsea missed out on promotion on goal difference, while QPR weren't far behind. West Ham United's failure to win promotion at the second attempt was compensated for by victory in the FA Cup.

Charlton Athletic, Burnley and Fulham went down to the Third Division.

Results

Maps

Third Division

Results

Maps

Fourth Division

Results

Maps

Election/Re-election to the Football League
Winners of the Alliance Premier League, Altrincham, won the right to apply for election to the Football League to replace one of the four bottom teams in the 1979–80 Football League Division Four. The vote went as follows:

As a result of this, all four Football League teams were re-elected, and Altrincham were denied membership of the League.

See also
 1979-80 in English football

References

Ian Laschke: Rothmans Book of Football League Records 1888–89 to 1978–79. Macdonald and Jane’s, London & Sydney, 1980.

 
English Football League seasons
1